The 2021 National League Division Series were two best-of-five-games series in Major League Baseball (MLB) to determine the participating teams of the 2021 National League Championship Series. The three divisional winners, seeded first through third, and a fourth team — determined by the NL Wild Card Game — played in two series. These matchups were:

 (1) San Francisco Giants (NL West champions) vs. (4) Los Angeles Dodgers (Wild Card Game winner): Dodgers win series 3–2.
 (2) Milwaukee Brewers (NL Central champions) vs. (3) Atlanta Braves (NL East champions): Braves win series 3–1.

The team with the better regular season record (higher seed) of each series hosted Games 1, 2, and (if necessary) 5, while the lower seeded team hosted Game 3 and 4.

The Braves would go on to defeat the Dodgers in six games in the 2021 National League Championship Series, and would then defeat the American League champion Houston Astros in six games in the 2021 World Series.

Background

Seeds one through three were determined by regular season winning percentages among division-winning teams. The final team was the winner of the National League Wild Card Game, played between the league's fourth and fifth seeded teams.

The Milwaukee Brewers clinched the National League Central on September 26, and secured the second-seed in the NL postseason via their 95–67 record. The Atlanta Braves clinched the National League East on September 30, and secured the third-seed in the NL postseason via their 88–73 record. The Brewers and Braves were tied in their season series, with both winning three games each.

The San Francisco Giants clinched the National League West on October 3, the last day of the regular season. With a 107–55 record, the Giants were the top seed in the National League postseason. The Los Angeles Dodgers defeated the St. Louis Cardinals in the Wild Card Game, 3–1, to advance to the NLDS. The postseason match-up between the two rivals was the first in their history and was a continuation of their battle over the NL West crown during the regular season. San Francisco won the season series over Los Angeles, 10–9.

The Giants made their first postseason appearance since 2016. This was the Braves' fourth straight postseason appearance, having won the NL East each of those seasons. The Brewers made their fourth straight postseason appearance, extending a franchise record. Also extending a franchise streak of postseason appearances were the Dodgers, who made their ninth straight appearance.

Matchups

San Francisco Giants vs. Los Angeles Dodgers

Milwaukee Brewers vs. Atlanta Braves

San Francisco vs. Los Angeles
This was the first postseason match-up between the Dodgers and Giants and a continuation of the tight divisional race between the two rivals, which saw the Giants win a franchise-record 107 games and the Dodgers tie theirs at 106 wins. The Dodgers and Giants divisional race became only the fourth time a pair of 100 win teams in the same division were separated by one game, the others being: 1915 Red Sox/Tigers; 1962 Giants/Dodgers; and 1993 Braves/Giants. The Giants won the season series, 10–9.

There had been no prior postseason match-ups between the two rivals in the modern era, but they had previously met with high stakes on the line. When the teams were located in New York, they met in the 1951 National League tie-breaker series, due to both teams finishing with identical win–loss records of 96–58. It is most famous for the walk-off home run hit by Bobby Thomson of the Giants in the deciding game, which has come to be known as baseball's "Shot Heard 'Round the World". In California, and with identical 101–61 records after 162 games, the teams met with a pennant on the line in the 1962 National League tie-breaker series. The Giants closed out the series in Game 3 with a 6–4 victory to clinch their first pennant in San Francisco.

There were various connections between the two clubs, mainly due to the presence of the Giants' president of baseball operations, Farhan Zaidi. Zaidi was the Dodgers' general manager from 2014 to 2018. Giants manager Gabe Kapler was the Dodgers' director of player development from 2014 to 2017, where he had a hand in helping develop many of the Dodgers' homegrown players.

Additionally, managers Gabe Kapler and Dave Roberts were both members of the famed curse-breaking 2004 Red Sox.

The Dodgers and Giants 213 combined regular season wins were the most in MLB postseason series history, beating out the 1998 World Series between the 114–48 Yankees and 98–64 Padres (212 combined victories).

Game 1

Walker Buehler started for the Dodgers but the Giants pounced on him in the first inning, with a two-run homer by Buster Posey. Buehler recovered after that and kept the Giants from scoring again until allowing a solo homer by Kris Bryant in the seventh. Overall he allowed the three runs in  innings on six hits and one walk, while striking out five. The Giants added one more run on a homer by Brandon Crawford off Alex Vesia in the eighth. Meanwhile, Logan Webb pitched for the Giants and completely dominated the Dodgers, allowing five hits in  scoreless innings while striking out 10. The Giants took game one, 4–0.

Game 2

Julio Urías started the second game for the Dodgers and only allowed one run on three hits in five innings, with five strikeouts. Kevin Gausman for the Giants allowed four runs in  innings. The Dodgers scored the first two runs in the second on RBI singles by Urías and Mookie Betts with the Giants getting one back in the bottom of the inning on a sacrifice fly by Donovan Solano. The Dodgers then scored four runs in the sixth on back-to-back doubles by Cody Bellinger and A. J. Pollock and they added three more in the eighth on a Will Smith homer and RBI singles by Matt Beaty and Corey Seager off of relievers Zack Littell and Jarlin García. The Giants scored on a Crawford single off Joe Kelly in the sixth but lost the game 9–2 to even up the series.

Game 3

Max Scherzer allowed only three hits and one walk in seven innings while striking out 10. However, one of the hits he allowed was a solo home run by Evan Longoria in the fifth inning. Alex Wood and three relievers combined to hold the Dodgers scoreless for the second time in the series and the Giants took back the lead with a 1–0 victory.

Game 4

In Game 4, the Dodgers jumped out to an early lead on a first inning RBI double by Trea Turner and a second inning sacrifice fly by Chris Taylor, driving Giants starter Anthony DeSclafani out of the game after just  innings, where he allowed the two runs on five hits. A two-run homer by Mookie Betts in the fourth inning off of Jarlin García extended the lead. Walker Buehler, starting on short rest for the first time in his career, pitched  innings for the Dodgers, walking two and giving up only three hits. He left the game with two runners on, one of whom (Evan Longoria), scored on a Darin Ruf ground out against Joe Kelly. The Dodgers got the run back on a Betts sacrifice fly off of Tyler Rogers. Kris Bryant drove in the Giants second run on a ground out against Blake Treinen in the eighth but the Dodgers put the game out of reach thanks to a Will Smith two-run homer in the bottom of the eighth against Jake McGee. They won 7–2 to tie the series up once more.

Game 5

The most recent prior Game 5 in a Division Series for the Dodgers was 2019, which they lost to the Washington Nationals, and for the Giants was 2012, which they won over the Cincinnati Reds. Logan Webb started for the Giants and went seven innings, while the Dodgers' Corey Knebel acted as an opener, only pitching the first inning. The Dodgers scored first, as Mookie Betts reached on a single in the sixth and was driven in on a double by Corey Seager. A home run by the Giants' Darin Ruf off of Julio Urías in the bottom of the inning tied the score. The Dodgers scored a run in the top off the ninth off of Giants closer Camilo Doval, via a hit by pitch and singles by Gavin Lux and Cody Bellinger. The Dodgers then sent in Max Scherzer to pitch the bottom of the ninth after Kenley Jansen pitched a scoreless eighth inning. With one out, Kris Bryant reached on an error by Justin Turner. Scherzer then recorded two strikeouts to end the threat. The final out was on a controversial checked swing third strike, as first base umpire Gabe Morales ruled that Wilmer Flores had offered on a two-strike pitch outside the strike zone. With their 110th win of the season (regular season and postseason), the Dodgers finally overtook the Giants and advanced to face the Atlanta Braves in the NLCS.

As a result of their NLDS Game 5 loss, the Giants became the second of three teams to win 105+ games in a season to not advance to the LCS since the Division Series was introduced in 1995. The two other teams that lost under the same circumstances were the 106-win 2019 Dodgers, and the 111-win 2022 Dodgers.

The Dodgers were only the third team in postseason history to allow no more than one run in two winner-take-all victories in the same year. The 2017 Astros did it in the ALCS and the World Series, while the 1981 Dodgers did it in both the NLDS and NLCS. The 2021 Dodgers also join the 2020 Rays, 2001 Diamondbacks and 1972 Athletics as teams to eke out multiple winner-take-all victories by a margin of no more than two runs in a single postseason.

Game 5 was the last of Buster Posey's career, who retired at the season's end.

Three months later, teams from San Francisco and Los Angeles met again in the postseason with the Los Angeles Rams defeating the San Francisco 49ers 20–17 in the 2021 NFC Championship game.

Milwaukee vs. Atlanta
This was the first postseason matchup between the Braves and the Brewers. The two teams each won three games in the six-game regular season series.

Historically, the Braves franchise was based in Milwaukee from 1953 to 1965, and both the Braves and Brewers retired the jersey of Hank Aaron, who started and ended his MLB career in the city of Milwaukee. While in the city, the Braves won the 1957 World Series, which was the franchise's second championship and last for 38 years. To date, it is the only World Series championship the city of Milwaukee has won.

Game 1

Game 1 of the series featured a pitcher's duel between Charlie Morton and Corbin Burnes. The game was scoreless until the bottom of the seventh, when Rowdy Tellez hit a two-run home run off of Morton to give Milwaukee the lead. In the eighth, Joc Pederson hit a pinch-hit solo home run to put the Braves on the board. The Braves made things interesting in the ninth against All-Star closer Josh Hader, but he closed the door after getting former Brewer Orlando Arcia to groundout to Kolten Wong. With the loss, the Braves fell to 4–12 in Game 1 of playoff series since 2000, with three of those wins coming in 2020.

Game 2

Game 2 featured a pitching match-up of Brandon Woodruff and Max Fried. Freddie Freeman and Ozzie Albies got the Braves on the board in the third inning with an RBI single and double (Albies double was originally ruled as a home run, but was changed on further review). Austin Riley extended the lead greeting Woodruff with a home run in his final inning of work. The Brewers put together a rally in the seventh inning, but Tyler Matzek stopped the threat by striking out Tyrone Taylor. The Brewers also had a bases loaded situation in the 9th, but closer Will Smith induced a game ending double-play off the bat of Luke Maile to tie the series at 1.

Game 3

Game 3 featured more of the same for the Brewers' offense, as they would be shut out in back-to-back games. In an attempt to try to get the offense going, Brewers starting pitcher Freddy Peralta was pulled after throwing four scoreless innings, as his spot was due up in the top of the fifth with runners on base. It did not work out as the Brewers threat was stopped and Joc Pederson belted a three-run home run in the fifth inning after Peralta was removed. Ian Anderson's five innings of scoreless ball was backed by stellar Braves' defense, as they moved one win from advancing back to the NL Championship Series.

Game 4

Milwaukee scored their first runs since the seventh inning of game 1 with Omar Narváez and Lorenzo Cain RBI line drive singles in the top of the fourth inning. The Braves answered when Eddie Rosario singled home two runs himself in the bottom of the fourth. In the fifth inning a Rowdy Tellez's two-run homer would also be answered by a Joc Pederson RBI groundout and a Travis d'Arnaud RBI single to tie the game again. The game remained tied until the bottom of the eighth inning when Freddie Freeman sent a Josh Hader slider into the left-center field bleachers to give the Braves a one-run lead. Will Smith struck out Christian Yelich in the ninth to send Atlanta to their second straight NL Championship Series.

See also
2021 American League Division Series

References

External links
Major League Baseball postseason schedule

Division Series
National League Division Series
National League Division Series
Atlanta Braves postseason
Milwaukee Brewers postseason
San Francisco Giants postseason
Los Angeles Dodgers postseason
2020s in Milwaukee
National League Division Series
National League Division Series
National League Division Series
National League Division Series
National League Division Series
National League Division Series